Crowley may refer to:

Places
Crowley, Mendocino County, California, an unincorporated community
Crowley County, Colorado
Crowley, Colorado, a town in Crowley County
Crowley, Louisiana, a city
Crowley, Oregon (disambiguation)
Crowley, Texas, a city
Crowley Lake, a reservoir in Mono County, California

Corporations
Crowley Foods, an American dairy company
Crowley Maritime, an American diversified transportation and logistics company
Crowley's, or Crowley Milner and Company, an American department store chain

Other uses
Crowley (surname)
Crowley (Supernatural), a character in American TV series Supernatural
"Mr. Crowley", a song by Ozzy Osbourne, named in reference to Aleister Crowley
Aleister Crowley, English occultist, ceremonial magician, poet, painter, novelist
USS Crowley, a US Navy destroyer escort which served in World War II
Crowley, the US title of 2008 British horror film Chemical Wedding
Crowley, a character in Good Omens, a novel by Neil Gaiman and Terry Pratchett

See also
 
 Cowley (disambiguation)